Lake Algonquin was a prehistoric proglacial lake that existed in east-central North America at the time of the last ice age. Parts of the former lake are now Lake Huron, Georgian Bay, Lake Superior, Lake Michigan, Lake Nipigon, and Lake Nipissing.

The lake varied in size, but it was at its biggest during the post-glacial period and gradually shrunk to the current Lake Huron and Georgian Bay. About 7,000 years ago, the lake was replaced by Lake Chippewa and Lake Stanley as the glaciers retreated and 3,000 years later by the current Lakes Michigan, Huron, and Superior.

Physiography
About 11,000 years before present, the Laurentian Glacier had retreated northward, forming a boundary across the northern edges of Lake Superior and Lake Huron. The lake drained through three outlets, the Chicago Outlet River, the St. Clair-Detroit River, and through the Trent Valley.

Outlets and stages
The first stage occupied only the south part of the basin of Lake Huron, including Saginaw Bay. It received tributary drainage from smaller lakes in the south part of the Georgian Bay and Lake Simcoe basins. Its existence is based on evidence of the establishment and erosion of its outlet through the distributaries of the St. Clair River at St. Clair, and on characters of the Niagara River and gorge. The steps of transition following this are simply physical and logical necessities, made so by the conditions of development from the first stage to the later fully developed Lake Algonquin, which included all three of the upper Great Lake basins.
 Early Lake Algonquin, 12,000 YBP, formed in Lake Huron Basin. Drained through Port Huron and ancestral St. Clair River to Early Lake Erie. The Tolleston beach or Calumet beach of Lake Chicago drained across the Two Creeks waterway in central Michigan, into the early Lake Algonquin.
 Kirkfield Low Stage
 Lake Chicago-Huron Stage
 Main Lake Algonquin, 11,000 YBP, the main phase of Lake Algonquin formed across both the Lake Michigan and Lake Huron basins, then overflowing the low lands of Michigan's Upper Peninsula.  Water levels continued to fluctuate.  Four water tables existed long enough to form identifiable beaches.  They include the Main Algonquin, Lower Algonquin, Battlefield and the Fort Brady beach levels.

By 10,500 YBP the lake gained a lower outlet across the front of the glacier, creating the North Bay Outlet.  Running in reverse to the modern French River, and across the divide into the ancestral Ottawa River. With water levels dropping, the two basins of Michigan and Huron, separated into individual lakes, entering the Lake Chippewa low phase in the Michigan Basin and the Lake Stanley Low Phase in the Huron Basin.

Early Lake Algonquin 
 
The Early Lake Algonquin covered only part of Lake Huron.  It included Saginaw Bay, but did not include Georgian Bay or any of the Lake Michigan or Lake Superior basins. Lake Chicago was in the southern portion of Lake Michigan and Lake Duluth was in the western tip of the Lake Superior basin. Lake water drained through the Port Huron outlet and down the St. Clair and Detroit rivers into Early Lake Erie. As the glacial front melted northward, the lake expanded in the Huron basin.  When it retreated north of Alpena, Michigan, the waters of Lake Chicago merged with Early Lake Algonquin. The two lakes were nearly the same level and no change of altitude.  Each maintained its original outlets; the Port Huron outlet on the southeast and the Chicago outlet in the southwest.

See also
Champlain Sea
 Lake Agassiz
 Lake Chicago
 Lake Maumee
Last glacial maximum
 Midcontinent Rift System
 Niagara Escarpment
Nipissing Great Lakes
List of prehistoric lakes

References

External links
 Glacial Lake Algonquin (estimated) shoreline map for a small part of northern Michigan: http://geo.msu.edu/research_topics/geographic-information-systems/

Former lakes of North America
Geology of Michigan
Proglacial lakes
Glacial lakes of the United States
Glacial lakes of Canada